Gaidouronisi ("donkey island") is the name of the following Greek islands:
Chrysi (island), Crete
Patroklos (Attica)